Niedziałka may refer to the following places in Poland:

Niedziałka Druga
Stara Niedziałka